Udo Kießling (born 21 May 1955) is a German retired ice hockey player. He competed at all Winter Olympics from 1976 to 1992, thus becoming the first ice hockey player to compete at five Olympics. He represented West Germany at the 1984 Canada Cup. He also played one game for the Minnesota North Stars on 13 March 1982, becoming the first German-trained player to appear in the NHL. He never played another NHL game. He was inducted into the International Ice Hockey Federation Hall of Fame in 2000.

Career statistics

Regular season and playoffs

International

See also 
 List of players who played only one game in the NHL

References

External links 
 IIHF Hockey Hall of Fame bio
 
 
 
 

1955 births
Living people
Augsburger Panther players
Düsseldorfer EG players
German expatriate ice hockey people
West German expatriate sportspeople in the United States
German ice hockey defencemen
Eishockey-Bundesliga players
Ice hockey players at the 1976 Winter Olympics
Ice hockey players at the 1980 Winter Olympics
Ice hockey players at the 1984 Winter Olympics
Ice hockey players at the 1988 Winter Olympics
Ice hockey players at the 1992 Winter Olympics
IIHF Hall of Fame inductees
Medalists at the 1976 Winter Olympics
Minnesota North Stars players
Olympic bronze medalists for West Germany
Olympic ice hockey players of Germany
Olympic ice hockey players of West Germany
Olympic medalists in ice hockey
People from Crimmitschau
Undrafted National Hockey League players
Sportspeople from Saxony
Expatriate ice hockey players in the United States
Sportspeople from Krefeld
East German emigrants to West Germany